Paul Arthur Schilpp (February 6, 1897 – September 6, 1993) was an American philosopher and educator.

Biography

Schilpp was born in Dillenburg, Germany and immigrated to the United States prior to World War I.  Schilpp taught at Northwestern University, University of Puget Sound, UC Santa Barbara, University of the Pacific and spent the last years of his professional career teaching undergraduate philosophy courses at Southern Illinois University Carbondale. Schilpp was president of the Western (now: Central) Division of the American Philosophical Association (1958–1959).

A serious and driven teacher of moral decision and thought, often controversial, Schilpp came to Southern Illinois University in 1965 after he was considered "too old to teach at respectable universities." Southern Illinois University agreed with his condition that he be allowed to instruct undergraduate general studies courses in philosophy thus allowing him to reach the greatest number of what Schilpp called "malleable minds".  He was known for his passionate teaching methods and highly energetic delivery.

Schilpp was for many years the editor of the Library of Living Philosophers.  As editor he was able to convince such notable personalities as Albert Einstein, Kurt Gödel, Karl Popper, and Bertrand Russell to contribute to the library.

Schilpp died of respiratory failure at the age of 96 in St. Louis, Missouri.

Publications
 Description and contents, v. 1 & v. 2

Paul Arthur Schilpp, ed. (1949),  The Philosophy of Ernst Cassirer

References

Sources 
 Schilpp's biography at Northwestern

1897 births
1993 deaths
20th-century American educators
Northwestern University faculty
German emigrants to the United States